The Duquesne Dukes are the athletic teams of Duquesne University of Pittsburgh, Pennsylvania. The Dukes compete in Division I of the National Collegiate Athletic Association as members of the Atlantic 10 Conference. Football and bowling, however, compete in the Northeast Conference.

Sports sponsored 

A member of the Atlantic 10 Conference, Duquesne University sponsors teams in six men's and eleven women's NCAA sanctioned sports. The football and bowling teams compete as associate members of the Northeast Conference.

Basketball 

The Dukes men's basketball team has had great success over the years, playing twice in national championship games in the 1950s and winning the National Invitation Tournament championship in 1955. The men's basketball Dukes annually play their cross-town rival, the University of Pittsburgh Panthers, in Pittsburgh's much anticipated and highly attended City Game. The current head coach is Keith Dambrot, who was hired in the spring of 2017.

The Dukes women's basketball team also plays the University of Pittsburgh every year in the women's version of the City Game.

Fictional portrayals 
A Duquesne Dukes men's basketball player's heart ailment serves as the major plot device for the pilot episode of Pittsburgh-based CBS medical drama Three Rivers.

Football 

Duquesne has played football as a club team from 1891 to 1894, 1896 to 1903, 1913 to 1914, and 1920 to 1928, in the NCAA Division I Football Bowl Subdivision (FBS) from 1929 to 1942 and 1947 to 1950, again as a club team from 1969 to 1978, in NCAA Division III from 1979 to 1992, and in the NCAA Division I Football Championship Subdivision (FCS) from 1993–present. The Dukes have won or shared 16 conference championships in the past 26 years.

Other varsity sports 
Duquesne's wrestling squad was a relatively successful NCAA Division I team that competed as an Independent. The Dukes wrestlers won two NCAA Division I East Regional Championships (2000 and 2005) and sent at least one wrestler to the NCAA Championships every year during John Hartupee's 11 seasons as head coach. The wrestling program eventually disbanded for a variety of reasons.

Duquesne fielded an NCAA varsity rifle team for many years (a coed sport). This team competed in the Middle Atlantic Rifle Conference, claiming a share of the conference title in the 2001–02 season. The team officially disbanded after the 2003–04 season.

In the fall 2012 semester, Duquesne's women's rowing team, for the first time, took first place in the varsity eight event at the Head of the Ohio, held in Pittsburgh.

Atlantic 10 Championships

Duquesne's first postseason/"full" Atlantic 10 team championship came in 1977 with a men's title in the Eastern Collegiate Basketball League (the forerunner to the Eastern Athletic Association—now known as the Atlantic 10 Conference). The Dukes have also won Atlantic 10 team championships in men's cross country (2005), women's cross country (2013, 2014 and 2020–21), women's volleyball (2013), women's soccer (2015) and women's swimming & diving (2018 and 2019). In addition, Duquesne has won numerous regular-season Atlantic 10 team championships. Men's basketball was co-champion of the league's regular seasons in 1980 and 1981 when it was known as the Eastern Athletic Association. Women's basketball was co-champion of the league's regular season in 2016. Men's soccer was co-champion of the league's regular season in 2003, sole champion in 2004 and again co-champion in 2005. Women's lacrosse was co-champion of the league's regular seasons in 2004 and 2005, and women's volleyball won an Atlantic 10 regular-season title in 2013.

The Dukes have also crowned postseason/"full" Atlantic 10 individual champions in men's cross country (2), women's rowing (8), swimming & diving [23 (men), 40 (women)], women’s indoor track & field (28) and outdoor track & field [29 (men), 25 (women)].

Postseason/"Full" (164)

Team (9)
Men's Basketball (1)
1977 – Eastern Collegiate Basketball League (the forerunner to the Eastern Athletic Association—now known as the Atlantic 10 Conference)

Men's Cross Country (1)
2005

Women's Cross Country (3)
2013
2014
2020-21

Women's Volleyball (1)
2013

Women's Soccer (1)
2015

Women's Swimming & Diving (2)
2018
2019

Individual (155)
Men's Cross Country (2)
Tom Slosky – 2007
Rico Galassi – 2016

Women's Rowing (8)
Novice 4 – 1999
Novice 4 – 2007
Lightweight 4 – 2007
Lightweight 8 – 2008
Lightweight 8 – 2009
Quad – 2012
Novice 4 – 2013
Novice 8 – 2013

Men's Swimming & Diving (23)
100-yard Freestyle – Edwin Wicker – 2003
100-yard Backstroke – Scott Darwin – 2005
200-yard Backstroke – Scott Darwin – 2005
50-yard Freestyle – Scott Darwin – 2006
100-yard Freestyle – Edwin Wicker – 2006
200-yard Freestyle Relay – Edwin Wicker, Ian Walsh, Mike Ley and Scott Darwin – 2006
50-yard Freestyle – Edwin Wicker – 2007
200-yard Freestyle Relay – Eric Bugby, Scott Darwin, Mike Ley and Edwin Wicker – 2007
100-yard Butterfly – Eric Bugby – 2007
400-yard Freestyle Relay – Eric Bugby, Scott Darwin, Ian Walsh and Edwin Wicker – 2007
800-yard Freestyle Relay – Jim O'Hara, Brendan Schilling, Ian Walsh and Edward LeBlanc – 2008
500-yard Freestyle – Edward LeBlanc – 2008
200-yard Freestyle Relay – Brendan Schilling, Jim O'Hara, Rich Ryan and Edward LeBlanc – 2008
200-yard Freestyle – Edward LeBlanc – 2008
400-yard Freestyle Relay – Jim O'Hara, Brendan Schilling, Ian Walsh and Edward LeBlanc – 2008
200-yard Freestyle – Edward LeBlanc – 2009
100-yard Breaststroke – Ian Walsh – 2009
800-yard Freestyle Relay – Jim O'Hara, Chris Kobela, Roman Becicka, Edward LeBlanc – 2010
500-yard Freestyle – Edward LeBlanc – 2010
200-yard Freestyle Relay – Brendan Schilling, Edward LeBlanc, Roman Becicka, Jim O'Hara – 2010
200-yard Freestyle – Edward LeBlanc – 2010
100-yard Freestyle – Edward LeBlanc – 2010
400-yard Freestyle Relay – Brendan Schilling, Jim O'Hara, Roman Becicka, Edward LeBlanc – 2010

Women's Swimming & Diving (40)
50-yard Freestyle – Katrina Streiner – 2006
200-yard Backstroke – Kyla Favret – 2006
100-yard Freestyle – Melissa Johnson – 2007
1,650-yard Freestyle – Liz Yager – 2007
200-yard Freestyle Relay – Melissa Johnson, Lauren Stephens, Christina Sherrard and Katrina Streiner – 2008
200-yard Freestyle – Melissa Johnson – 2008
200-yard Backstroke – Kyla Favret – 2008
100-yard Freestyle – Melissa Johnson – 2008
50-yard Freestyle – Christina Sherrard – 2009
100-yard Freestyle – Christina Sherrard – 2009
400-yard Individual Medley – Miriam McGeath – 2011
400-yard Individual Medley – Meghan Smith – 2013
400-yard Individual Medley – Miriam McGeath – 2014
400-yard Individual Medley – Lexi Santer – 2015
100-yard Backstroke – Abby Watson – 2015
200-yard Freestyle Relay – Sam Ray, Kristen McKnight, Claire Nobles and Gabrielle Sibilia – 2016
200-yard Backstroke – Lexi Santer – 2016
100-yard Freestyle – Samantha Ray – 2016
200-yard Medley Relay – Abby Watson, Kayla Owens, Kristen McKnight and Michelle Heim – 2017
200-yard Medley Relay – Abby Watson, Abigail Stauffer, Kristen McKnight and Michelle Heim – 2018
200-yard Individual Medley – Emma Brinton – 2018
500-yard Freestyle – Lauren Devorace – 2018
400-yard Individual Medley – Emma Brinton – 2018
200-yard Breaststroke – Abigail Stauffer – 2019
400-yard Individual Medley – Emma Brinton – 2019
400-yard Medley Relay – Emma Brinton, Abigail Stauffer, Audrey Steen and Hanna Everhart – 2019
200-yard Individual Medley – Emma Brinton – 2019
800-yard Freestyle Relay – Emma Brinton, Hanna Everhart, Lauren Devorace and Carson Gross – 2019
800-yard Freestyle Relay – Emma Brinton, Carson Gross, Lauren Devorace and Hanna Everhart – 2020
100-yard Freestyle – Hanna Everhart – 2020
200-yard Freestyle – Hanna Everhart – 2020
200-yard Individual Medley – Emma Brinton – 2021
400-yard Individual Medley – Emma Brinton – 2021
200-yard Freestyle – Hanna Everhart – 2021
100-yard Backstroke – Audrey Steen – 2021
400-yard Medley Relay – Reagan Linkous, Madison Dickert, Audrey Steen and Hanna Everhart – 2021
800-yard Freestyle Relay – Mendy De Rooi, Hayley Taylor, Emma Menzer and Hanna Everhart – 2022
200-yard Freestyle – Hanna Everhart – 2022
100-yard Freestyle – Mendy De Rooi – 2022
1-meter Diving - Amy Read - 2023

Women's Indoor Track & Field (28)
Triple Jump – Shea McMillan – 2002
4,000-meter Distance Medley Relay – Michelle Flynn, Julie Tyo, Alison Buchanan and Carrie Hucko – 2003
1,000-meter Run – Tara Gerlach – 2004
3,200-meter Relay – Tara Gerlach, Elizabeth Graham, Alison Buchanan and Michelle Flynn – 2004
4,000-meter Distance Medley Relay – Tara Gerlach, Emily Beahan, Ashley Earnest and Amy Ruffolo – 2006
1,000-meter Run – Emily Beahan – 2007
4,000-meter Distance Medley Relay – Amy Ruffolo, Ashley Earnest, Emily Beahan and Samantha Howard – 2007
Pole Vault – Daniela Siciliano – 2007
200-meter Dash – Melissa Miller – 2010
400-meter Dash – Melissa Miller – 2010
500-meter Run – Taylor Glenn – 2011
Shot Put – Ashley Adams – 2011
High Jump – Sherie Key – 2013
500-meter Run – Anna Simone – 2014
800-meter Run – Elise Farris – 2014
1,000-meter Run – Haley Pisarcik – 2014
Pentathlon – Louise Prevoteau – 2014
3,200-meter Relay – Haley Pisarcik, Shelby Haitz, Amber Valimont and Elise Farris – 2014
4,000-meter Distance Medley Relay – Haley Pisarcik, Shannon Abraham, Elise Farris and Amber Valimont – 2014
500-meter Run – Anna Simone – 2015
Pentathlon – Louise Prevoteau – 2015
200-meter Dash – Bethany Evankovich – 2018
500-meter Run – Bethany Evankovich – 2018
400-meter Run – Bethany Evankovich – 2020
1,600-meter Relay – Gabby Holmberg, Kel-Lisa Sebwe, Maiah Yankello and Bethany Evankovich – 2020
500-meter Run – Hannah Seitzinger – 2022
Pentathlon – Emily Brozeski – 2023
500-meter Run – Hannah Seitzinger – 2023

Men's Outdoor Track & Field (29)
Long Jump – Leigh Bodden^ – 2002
10,000-meter Run – Ryan Bender – 2004
High Jump – Mike Murawski – 2005
Hammer Throw – Chuck Mohan – 2005
Discus Throw – Chuck Mohan – 2005
3,000-meter Steeplechase – Tom Slosky – 2005
3,000-meter Steeplechase – Tom Slosky – 2006
Discus Throw – Robert Healy III^ – 2006
3,000-meter Steeplechase – Derek Dutille – 2007
10,000-meter Run – Josh Eddy – 2007
3,000-meter Steeplechase – Tom Slosky – 2008
100-meter Dash – Shakiel Carter – 2014
5,000-meter Run – Jim Spisak – 2014
10,000-meter Run – Jim Spisak – 2014
Long Jump – Ian Welch – 2014
Long Jump – Ian Welch – 2015
3,000-meter Steeplechase – Evan Gomez – 2015
400-meter Relay – Andrew George, Robert Norman, David O'Such and Isaac Elliott  – 2018
100-meter Dash – Isaac Elliott  – 2019
200-meter Dash – Isaac Elliott  – 2019
3,000-meter Steeplechase – Casey Conboy – 2021
100-meter Dash – Isaac Elliott  – 2021
200-meter Dash – Isaac Elliott  – 2021
800-meter Run – Matt Busche  – 2021
100-meter Dash – Isaac Elliott  – 2022
200-meter Dash – Isaac Elliott  – 2022
800-meter Run - Collin Ebling -  2022
Triple Jump - Logan Williamson - 2022
400-meter Relay - Ryan Marcella, David Williams, Ian Thrush and Isaac Elliott  – 2022

^ Bodden and Healy are the only athletes in school history to have won a MAAC/NEC football title (team) and an Atlantic 10 title of any kind (team or individual). They are also believed to be the only athletes in school history to have won conference championships in multiple sports (excluding cross country and track & field combinations) or even to have been first-team all-conference in multiple sports (again, excluding XC-TF combos).

Women's Outdoor Track & Field (25)
100-meter Hurdles – Nicole Wiley – 2001
400-meter Hurdles – Kathleen McCabe – 2002
Triple Jump – Shea McMillan – 2002
Discus Throw – Melissa Stewart – 2003
Pole Vault – Sarah Fetterman – 2004
Pole Vault – Sarah Fetterman – 2005
3,000-meter Steeplechase – Amy Ruffolo – 2005
400-meter Hurdles – Kristen Micsky – 2005
Long Jump – Kristen Micsky – 2005
Triple Jump – Kristen Micsky – 2005 
Discus Throw – Ashley Adams – 2010
200-meter Dash – Taylor Glenn – 2011
400-meter Hurdles – Nicole Cherok – 2012
400-meter Hurdles – Nicole Cherok – 2103
3,000-meter Steeplechase – Amber Valimont – 2013
Long Jump – Brittney Edwards – 2013
400-meter Hurdles – Anna Simone – 2014
High Jump – Sherie Key – 2014
Heptathlon – Louise Prevoteau – 2014
3,000-meter Steeplechase – Danica Snyder – 2015
400-meter Hurdles – Anna Simone – 2105
Javelin Throw – Julia Franzosa – 2016
3,000-meter Steeplechase – Valerie Palermo – 2016
3,000-meter Steeplechase – Valerie Palermo – 2017
Heptathlon – Emily Brozeski – 2022

Regular Season (9)

Team (9)
Men's Basketball (2)
1980 – co-champions – Eastern Athletic Association
1981 – co-champions – Eastern Athletic Association

Women's Basketball (1)
2016 – Co-Champions

Men's Soccer (3)
2003 – Co-Champions
2004
2005 – Co-Champions

Women's Lacrosse (2)
2004 – Co-Champions
2005 – Co-Champions

Women's Volleyball (1)
2013

MAAC and NEC Football Conference Championships

Club sports

Duquesne fields many club, or non-varsity, teams that compete regularly against other schools. Club sports offered at Duquesne are men's ice hockey, indoor track & field, tennis, lacrosse and roller hockey.

The men's ice hockey team is affiliated with the Division I level of the American Collegiate Hockey Association, competing in the College Hockey Mid-America conference. The team was CHMA champions during the 2006–07 and 2008–09 seasons. They participated in the national ACHA tournament in 2004–05, 2005–06 and 2008–09, finishing eighth in the country in 2006. Duquesne will field a Division III team for the 2021-22 season, joining College Hockey East.

The men's indoor track & field program practices and competes alongside Duquesne's varsity women's indoor track & field program during the winter months and is affiliated with the Intercollegiate Association of Amateur Athletes of America. The men's team is recognized as varsity during the spring months when it becomes an outdoor track & field program and competes in the Atlantic 10, though it maintains its affiliation with the IC4A.

The Duquesne club tennis team is a part of the United States Tennis Association's Tennis on Campus program.

Mascot
The "Dukes" nickname dates back to 1911, when what is now Duquesne University changed its name to honor the Marquis Du Quesne, the French governor of Canada, who first brought Catholic observances to the Pittsburgh area.

Since a Marquis and a Duke are not visually distinct (and the name "Duquesne" implies a "Duke"), the unofficial symbol of the school's athletic teams became a man dressed in a top hat, tails and a regal sash across his chest. "Dukes" being more readily recognized than "Marquis," the name Duke was popularly assigned to the symbol and stuck ever since the fall of 1911.

The Duquesne Department of Athletics unveiled its most notable "Duke" mascot prior to the January 18, 2003 game against the University of Richmond. The Duke is 7-feet tall with an oversized head and sports a dapper navy blue suit with red piping, a red shirt with a red bow tie, and red gloves, with a black top hat. The new Duke replaces "Duke the Bear" who was a fixture at DU athletic events since 1996.

At the December 13, 2008 game versus West Virginia, Duquesne introduced its new human-figure mascot to replace the  character mascot. The mascot traditionally sports its black jacket with coat-tails and overbearing top-hat.

Before the 2010 City Game vs the Pittsburgh Panthers, Duquesne introduced the new character mascot at an annual alumni event.

On January 13, 2021, Duquesne Athletics revealed a new representation of the Duke on social media. The new logo, stylized similarly to the Duquesne “D” athletics logo is a geometric lion’s head wearing a top hat. The lion insignia is present in the seal of Duquesne University and is a new direction and interpretation of the Duke itself.

Duquesne's school colors of red and blue, the colors of the Holy Ghost Fathers, have been in place since the school's inception.

University fight song
The Victory Song (Red and Blue) was written in 1926. Words and music were composed by Father Thomas J. Quigley (class of 1927).

References

External links